The Railway is a Grade II listed public house at 153 Manchester Road, Broadheath, Altrincham, Greater Manchester WA14 5NT.

It is on the Campaign for Real Ale's National Inventory of Historic Pub Interiors.

It was built mid-19th century, and was saved from demolition in 1996.

References

Grade II listed pubs in Greater Manchester
Grade II listed buildings in the Metropolitan Borough of Trafford
National Inventory Pubs
Altrincham